The 6th Transportation Battalion is a transportation battalion of the United States Army first constituted in 1943. The 6th Transportation Battalion has participated in World War II, Vietnam, Desert Storm, Operation New Dawn.

The battalion's inactivation ceremony was held on 28 August 2012.

Operation New Dawn 2011–12
The battalion returned from a one-year deployment to Kuwait in March/April 2012.

Lineage
Constituted 17 June 1943 in the Army of the United States as Headquarters and Headquarters Detachment, 6th Quartermaster Troop Transport Battalion

Activated 26 August 1943 at Fort Devens, Massachusetts

Reorganized and redesignated 20 November 1943 as Headquarters and Headquarters Detachment, 6th Quartermaster Battalion, Mobile

Converted and redesignated 1 August 1946 as Headquarters and Headquarters Detachment, 6th Transportation Corps Truck Battalion

Redesignated 22 April 1947 as Headquarters and Headquarters Detachment, 6th Transportation Truck Battalion

Inactivated 19 January 1949 in Germany

Redesignated 16 July 1952 as Headquarters and Headquarters Company, 6th Transportation Truck Battalion, and allotted to the Regular Army

Activated 15 August 1952 at Fort Eustis, Virginia

Reorganized and redesignated 20 February 1959 as Headquarters and Headquarters Detachment, 6th Transportation Battalion

Inactivated 14 June 1972 at Oakland Army Base, California

Activated 16 March 1979 at Fort Eustis, Virginia

Campaign participation credit

World War II: Northern France; Rhineland; Central Europe

Vietnam: Counteroffensive, Phase II; Counteroffensive, Phase III; Tet Counteroffensive; Counteroffensive, Phase IV; Counteroffensive, Phase V; Counteroffensive, Phase VI; Tet 69/Counteroffensive; Summer-Fall 1969; Winter-Spring 1970; Sanctuary Counteroffensive; Counteroffensive, Phase VII; Consolidation I; Consolidation II; Cease-Fire

Southwest Asia: Defense of Saudi Arabia; Liberation and Defense of Kuwait; Cease-Fire

Iraq Campaign

Decorations
Meritorious Unit Commendation (Army) for VIETNAM 1966–1967
Meritorious Unit Commendation (Army) for VIETNAM 1968–1969
Meritorious Unit Commendation (Army) for VIETNAM 1969–1970
Meritorious Unit Commendation (Army) for SOUTHWEST ASIA

References

External links
 6th Transportation Battalion

0006
Quartermaster battalions of the United States Army